The Norwottuck Rail Trail Bridge (also known as the Northampton Lattice Truss Bridge) is a former crossing of Boston and Maine Railroad over the Connecticut River in western Massachusetts, connecting the towns of Northampton and Hadley, by the Norwottuck Rail Trail, which is currently used for bicycle and foot traffic.

History
The Norwottuck Rail Trail Bridge is an eight-span steel lattice truss bridge.  It crosses Elwell Island in the middle of the river, providing no access to the island in an attempt to keep the island otherwise untouched.  Riding over the bridge shows eight spans, with two of them over Elwell Island.  It was built by the R. F. Hawkins Ironworks Company.

To survive the 1936 flood, railroad cars loaded with scrap metal were placed on the bridge to weigh it down.

The bridge was redesigned by Vanasse Hangen Brustlin, Inc. of Watertown, rebuilt by MassHighway, and opened in 1992 to bicycle and foot traffic as part of the Norwottuck Rail Trail.

See also
List of bridges documented by the Historic American Engineering Record in Massachusetts
List of crossings of the Connecticut River

References

External links

 Image of the Connecticut River Truss Bridge, ca. 1906 
 Vanasse Hangen Brustlin, Inc.

Railroad bridges in Massachusetts
Pedestrian bridges in Massachusetts
Rail trail bridges in the United States
Bridges over the Connecticut River
Bridges in Hampshire County, Massachusetts
Buildings and structures in Northampton, Massachusetts
Bridges completed in 1887
Historic American Engineering Record in Massachusetts
History of Hampshire County, Massachusetts
Steel bridges in the United States
Lattice truss bridges in the United States